Unfair business practices encompass fraud, misrepresentation, and oppressive or unconscionable acts or practices by business, often against consumers, and are prohibited by law in many countries. In the European Union, each member state must regulate unfair business practices in accordance with the Unfair Commercial Practices Directive, subject to transitional periods.

In the United States, the Federal Trade Commission's Bureau of Consumer Protection works to prevent unfair business practices by:
"collecting reports from consumers and conducting investigations, suing companies and people that break the law, developing rules to maintain a fair marketplace, and educating consumers and businesses about their responsibilities." 
Individual states within the U.S. are also responsible for protecting consumers against unfair practices.

The Consumer Protection Act, protects Alberta, Canada consumers from being taken advantage of.

Unfair business practices may arise in many areas, including:
Tenancy matters
Matters involving the advertising and sale of products and services to consumers
Matters involving insurance claims and the settlement thereof
Debt collection in cases of default

In addition to providing for the award of compensatory damages, laws may also provide for the award of punitive damages as well as the payment of the plaintiff's legal fees.

At common law, individuals were not entitled to attorney's fees or punitive damages for wrongful acts committed by businesses in most states.  Most often, laws prohibiting unfair business practices require consumers to send a demand letter to the business prior to commencing a lawsuit.  If the business fails to make a reasonable offer of settlement within a specified period of time, and is subsequently found liable in court, it may be liable for punitive damages and the injured party's reasonable attorney's fees under many statutes.  In some instances, the statutes provide for prevailing plaintiffs to recover double or triple the actual damages against non-settling defendants.

When statutes prohibiting unfair and deceptive business practices provide for the award of punitive damages and attorney's fees to injured parties, they provide a powerful incentive for businesses to resolve the claim through the settlement process rather than risk a more costly judgment in court.

See also
Anti-competitive practices
Competition law plan of business
Competition policy
Consumer protection
Misleading or deceptive conduct (Australian law)
Restraint of trade
Sucker list
Unfair competition

References

External links 
 

Business law